Huibert Marie Luns (6 June 1881, Paris – 24 February 1942, Amsterdam) was a Dutch painter, sculptor and writer. He also designed book covers, posters and medals.

Biography 
Shortly after his birth, his parents returned to Amsterdam. His interest in art was inspired by a visit to the studios of Lawrence Alma-Tadema, a Dutch painter who lived in London.

He established his first studio in Brussels, where his parents were then living, and became a member of Pour L'Art; an association of young artists. While there, he worked with the Belgian sculptor, Charles van der Stappen. In 1904, he entered the Prix de Rome competition, but his friend, Jan Sluijters, was the winner. That same year, he was a runner-up for the Willink van Collenprijs. Four years later, he became a teacher at the Academie voor Beeldende Kunsten en Technische Wetenschappen (now known as the "Willem de Kooning Academie") in Rotterdam.

In 1909, he married Harriet Louvrier (1889-1977), from Tongeren. They had six children, including Joseph Luns, who served as Minister of Foreign Affairs (1952-1971) and Secretary-General of NATO (1971-1984).

In 1917 Luns was appointed as principal of the Koninklijke School voor Kunst, Techniek en Ambacht He remained in this position for five years. In 1923, he became Director of the Rijksnormaalschool, a position formerly held by Willem Molkenboer (Antoon and Theo's father). He was awarded the Order of Orange-Nassau in 1930. The following year, he was named a Professor of history painting and sculpture at the Technische Hogeschool Delft, where he remained until his retirement.

Despite his administrative and teaching duties, he continued to be active as a painter and writer of art-related books. He also created a statue to commemorate the French refugees who died in the Netherlands during World War I; located in Maastricht.

Luns' work was included in the 1939 exhibition and sale Onze Kunst van Heden (Our Art of Today) at the Rijksmuseum in Amsterdam.

Selected writings 
 De Rubens-symfonie (1927, Van Munster's) Full text @ DBNL
 Tien wandelingen in Napels & Sicilië (1928, W.L. en J. Brusse) Picture of cover @ Goodreads
 Spaansche schilders (1932, W.L. en J. Brusse)
 Holland schildert (1941, Strengholt) Full text @ DBNL
 Jan Sluijters (1941, Palet-serie, H.J.W. Becht)

References

External links 

 ArtNet: More works by Luns.

1881 births
1942 deaths
20th-century Dutch painters
Dutch male painters
Portrait painters
Post-impressionist painters
Dutch art critics
Dutch sculptors
Dutch male sculptors
Painters from Amsterdam
Dutch poster artists
Officers of the Order of Orange-Nassau
20th-century Dutch male artists
Dutch expatriates in France